Crossing Trails is a 1921 American silent Western film directed by Clifford Smith and starring Pete Morrison, Esther Ralston and Lew Meehan.

Cast
 Pete Morrison as Jim Warren
 Esther Ralston as Helen Stratton
 John Hatton as Buster Stratton
 Lew Meehan as 'Red' Murphy
 Hal Taliaferro as Peter Marcus 
 J.B. Warner as 'Bull' Devine
 Billie Bennett as Mrs Warren

References

Bibliography
 Connelly, Robert B. The Silents: Silent Feature Films, 1910-36, Volume 40, Issue 2. December Press, 1998.
 Munden, Kenneth White. The American Film Institute Catalog of Motion Pictures Produced in the United States, Part 1. University of California Press, 1997.

External links
 

1921 films
1921 Western (genre) films
Silent American Western (genre) films
American silent feature films
American black-and-white films
1920s English-language films
Films directed by Clifford Smith
1920s American films